Serhiy Podolynsky (19 July 1850 – 1891) was a Ukrainian socialist, physician, and an early pioneer of ecological economics. He set out to reconcile socialist thought with the second law of thermodynamics by synthesising the approaches of Karl Marx, Charles Darwin and Sadi Carnot. In his essay "Socialism and the Unity of Physical Forces" (1880), Podolinsky theorized a labor theory of value based on embodied energy.

Bibliography
 "Le Socialisme et la Théorie de Darwin (Socialism and the Theory of Darwin)," La Revue Socialiste, issue 3, 1880. pp. 129-148.
 "Le Socialisme et l'unité des forces physiques (Socialism and the Unity of Physical Forces)," La Revue Socialiste, issue 8, June 1880. pp. 353-365.
 "Menschliche arbeit und einheit der kraft (Human Labor and the Unity of Physical Forces)," Die Neue Zeit, September-October 1883. pp. 413-424, 449-457.

References

Ecological economists
Marxian economists

Ecologists from the Russian Empire
1850 births
1891 deaths
People from Cherkasy Oblast
People from Kiev Governorate
Burials at Zvirynets Cemetery
Economists from the Russian Empire